Astin is a surname. Notable people with the surname include:

Alexander Astin (born 1932), American education professor
Allen V. Astin (1904–1984), American physicist and director of the National Institute of Standards and Technology
Anne Astin, Australian biochemist and forensic expert
Barrett Astin (born 1991), American pitcher
Helen Astin (1932–2015), Greek-born American education professor
James Astin (1900–?), English footballer
John Astin (born 1930), American actor and teacher
Mackenzie Astin (born 1973), American actor, son of John Astin and Patty Duke
Patty Duke Astin, now known as Patty Duke (1946–2016), US actor, singer, author, and mental health advocate; ex-wife of John Astin
Sean Astin (born 1971), American actor, director, producer, and voice artist; son of Patty Duke; adopted son of John Astin
Skylar Astin (born 1987), American actor and musician

Fictional characters
Jan Rek ter'Astin, a character in the fictional Liaden universe
Dr. Robert Astin, a character in the television series Quincy, M.E.

Other uses
Astin, Koine Greek name for Vashti, first wife of King Ahasuerus in the Book of Esther
ASTIN, acronym for Actuarial Studies in Non-life Insurance, a section of the International Actuarial Association

See also
 Asten (disambiguation)
 Aston (disambiguation)
 Austin (disambiguation)